The R576 road is a regional road in Ireland which runs west to east leaving the N21 national primary road in County Kerry at Feale's Bridge and ending at the N72 secondary road east of the town of Kanturk in County Cork. 

From Feale's Bridge the route passes the parish of Brosna. Two local roads branch off the R576 to Brosna and Mountcollins, County Limerick respectively. It then enters County Cork passing through the village of Rockchapel. The quality of the road gets very poor from Rockchapel with a series of twisty bends before it passes through the narrow main street in Newmarket where short delays can occur. The route then improves dramatically leaving Newmarket with some stretches of hard shoulder. It then goes through Kanturk with the only roundabout junction on the route before terminating at the N72.

See also
Roads in Ireland
National primary road
National secondary road

References
Roads Act 1993 (Classification of Regional Roads) Order 2006 – Department of Transport

Regional roads in the Republic of Ireland
Roads in County Kerry
Roads in County Cork